Charles George Perceval, 7th Earl of Egmont (15 June 1845 – 5 September 1897) was a British peer and Conservative Party politician of the Victorian era.

On 19 September 1868, he was commissioned a cornet in the 2nd Regiment of the Royal Buckinghamshire Yeomanry.

He was elected at the general election in February 1874 as the Member of Parliament (MP) for the parliamentary borough of Midhurst in Surrey.
However, he succeeded to the peerage on 2 August that year, taking both the Irish title of Earl of Egmont and the title Baron Arden in the Peerage of the United Kingdom. The latter title gave him a seat in House of Lords, thereby vacating his seat in the House of Commons. He was promoted from lieutenant to captain in the Yeomanry on 25 November 1874.

On 8 April 1878, he was appointed a deputy lieutenant of Surrey. He sold the family estates around Churchtown, County Cork in 1889.

Notes

External links 
 

1845 births
1897 deaths
Conservative Party (UK) MPs for English constituencies
UK MPs 1874–1880
Egmont, E7
Royal Buckinghamshire Yeomanry officers
Deputy Lieutenants of Surrey
Earls of Egmont
3